The 2015 season is FC Seoul's 32nd season in the K League Classic

Pre-season
 In Guam: From 3 January 2015 to 22 January 2015 
 In Kagoshima, Japan: From 25 January 2015 to 8 February 2015

Practice match results

Competitions

Overview

K League Classic

League table

Results summary

Results by round

K League Classic

FA Cup

AFC Champions League

Play-off round

Group stage

Knockout stage

Round of 16

Match reports and match highlights
Fixtures and Results at FC Seoul Official Website

Season statistics

K League Classic records

All competitions records

Attendance records

 Season total attendance is K League Classic, FA Cup, AFC Champions League in the aggregate and friendly match attendance is not included.

Squad statistics

Goals

Assists

Coaching staff

Players

Team squad
All players registered for the 2015 season are listed.

(In)

1(Retired)

(Out)
(Out)

(Out)

1(Out)

(In)

(Discharged)

<small>(Conscripted)[3]
(In)

 From 1 May, Cha Du-ri appointed as new captain.
 Koh Myoung-jin served as captain by 30 April
 Kang Seung-jo was conscripted in the middle of season.

Out on loan & military service

 

※ In : Transferred from other teams in the middle of season.
※ Out : Transferred to other teams in the middle of season.
※ Discharged : Transferred from Sangju Sangmu and Ansan Police for military service in the middle of season. (Registered in 2015 season)
※ Conscripted : Transferred to Sangju Sangmu and Ansan Police for military service after end of season.

Transfers

In

Rookie Draft & Free Agent

(1) 우선지명 : 각 구단 유소년 클럽 출신 선수들에 대해 4명까지 우선 지명
(2) 일반지명 : 1순위에서 6순위까지 추첨순서에서 의해서 지명하며 유소년클럽 출신에 대한우선지명이 3순위 지명권에 해당되며 구단 사정에 따라 지명권을 행사 안 할 수 있음 
(3) 번외지명 : 6순위까지 끝나고 번외로 다시 6순위까지 선수 지명
(4) 추가지명 : 드래프트에서 미선발된 선수들에 한하여 2월말까지 구단 자율적으로 지명

 (대) 표기는 드래프트에 참여하여 선발은 되었지만 당해 연도에 입단하지 않고 대학 진학 후 입단하는 선수를 의미한다.
 (대후) 표기는 드래프트에 기 선발된 후 대학에 진학하여 중퇴 및 졸업 후 당해 연도에 입단하는 선수를 의미한다.
 근거자료

Out

Loan & Military service

Technical report

Starting 11 & Formation 
This section shows the most used players for each position considering a 3–5–2 formation.

Substitutes

See also
 FC Seoul

References

 FC Seoul 2015 Matchday Magazines

External links
 FC Seoul Official Website 

FC Seoul seasons
Seoul